Blet is a commune in the Cher department in the Centre-Val de Loire region of France.

Geography

Population

Sights
 The church of St. Germain, dating from the twelfth century.
 An early nineteenth-century market hall.
 Traces of a Roman aqueduct.
 The fifteenth-century château and park.

See also
Communes of the Cher department

References

External links

An official webpage about Blet 

Communes of Cher (department)
Bourbonnais